Aurotype is a monochrome photographic printing process that uses Gold chloride, potassium ferricyanide and ferrocyanide. It was described in 1844 by Robert Hunt.  It is a member of the Siderotype family of processes.

References

Photographic processes dating from the 19th century